Mystery by Moonlight is the 167th volume in the Nancy Drew Mystery series and published in July 2002 by Simon & Schuster under the Aladdin imprint.

Plot summary
Nancy, Ned, Bess, and George house sit for George's cousin, Jason. While there, Bess is convinced the cabin is haunted after hearing noises during the night in the attic. There's only one problem – there is no attic. Nancy decides to investigate the noises, but soon unearths another mystery involving a family treasure.

Adaptation
In November 2002 Her Interactive released the 7th computer game in the Nancy Drew Series, Ghost Dogs of Moon Lake, based loosely on this book and a short story in the Nancy Drew Ghost Stories.

Nancy Drew books
2002 American novels
2002 children's books
Novels adapted into video games